John Lincoln Tattersall (16 April 1865 – 6 June 1942) was an English cotton merchant and Liberal Party politician.

Family
Tattersall was the son of Cornelius Tattersall a Manchester cotton merchant. In 1886, Cornelius bought the cotton mill at Woodeaves, near Ashbourne, Derbyshire, which employed around 100 workers. Cornelius installed his son John at the mill to give him manufacturing experience. In 1893 Tattersall married Lizzie Harland and they established a home in the village of Thorpe, Derbyshire. They later left Derbyshire and set up home in Prestbury, Cheshire. He named his new home Woodeaves.

Philanthropy
Tattersall continued to take an interest in the area around Fenny Bentley after leaving the area. In 1939, although he was by religion a nonconformist, (his funeral service took place at the Congregational Church in Hale), Tattersall funded improvements to the village church including the re-siting of the pulpit and paving the sanctuary in Hopton Wood stone. He also provided the wooden lectern, a replica of the medieval lectern at York Minster. Tattersall paid for outings and parties for the village children, funding these entertainments even after he had left the area. He was buried in the Church at Fenny Bentley. He was a strong supporter of the temperance movement and was sometime President of the Manchester and the Lancashire & Cheshire Band of Hope Union.

Career
Like his father, Tattersall was a cotton trader. He was a member of the Executive Committee of the Master Cotton Spinners Federation   and chairman, later President of the Cotton Yarn Association. In 1929 he became a director of the Lancashire Cotton Corporation, a huge new cotton combine set up with government and Bank of England support to amalgamate up to 150 mills in order to increase efficiency and create economies of scale in the face of the serious difficulties facing the industry in the 1920s.

Politics
Tattersall first stood for Parliament at the 1922 general election as Liberal candidate at Stalybridge and Hyde in industrial Cheshire. In a three-cornered contest he was runner-up to the Conservative candidate John Phillips Rhodes, with Labour’s P H Ward, bottom of the poll.

At the 1923 general election, Tattersall had the advantage of a straight fight against Rhodes in Stalybridge, with Labour voters expected to switch their allegiance to the Liberals. Tattersall also made use of his position as a strong advocate of the traditional Liberal policy of Free Trade in an election called over the issue by Prime Minister Stanley Baldwin and he captured the seat with a majority of 2,374 votes.

However, by 1924 the political situation was transformed. The Tory Party was resurgent after the brief interlude of the first Labour government. Labour decided to contest the general election in Stalybridge again, splitting the anti-Tory vote, and Tattersall sank to the bottom of the poll with 22% of the vote, the new Conservative candidate, Edmund Wood,  regaining the seat for his party with a majority of 3,903 over Labour.

Tattersall did not try for re-election to the House of Commons again.

Death
Tattersall died on 6 June 1942, aged 77 years.

References

External links 
 

1865 births
1942 deaths
UK MPs 1923–1924
Liberal Party (UK) MPs for English constituencies
Politics of Cheshire
Members of the Parliament of the United Kingdom for Stalybridge and Hyde